William Kirtley may refer to:
 William Kirtley (railway engineer), English railway engineer
 William W. Kirtley, known as Bill, American anti-death penalty activist
 Bill Kirtley, English football goalkeeper